The 2016–17 Cypriot Second Division was the 62nd season of the Cypriot second-level football league. It began on 16 September 2016 and ended on 25 March 2017. Alki Oroklini won their first title.

Team changes from 2015–16

Teams promoted to 2016–17 Cypriot First Division
 Karmiotissa
 AEZ Zakakiou
 Anagennisi Deryneia

Teams relegated from 2015–16 Cypriot First Division
 Enosis Neon Paralimni
 Ayia Napa
 Pafos

Teams promoted from 2015–16 Cypriot Third Division
 Akritas Chlorakas
 Alki Oroklini
 Ethnikos Assia

Teams relegated to 2016–17 Cypriot Third Division
 Elpida Xylofagou
 Nikos & Sokratis Erimis
 Digenis Oroklinis

Stadia and locations

Note: Table lists clubs in alphabetical order.

League table

Results

References

Cypriot Second Division seasons
2016–17 in Cypriot football
Cyprus